Natur all is the first studio album by Serbian hard rock band Cactus Jack, released in 2004.

Preceded by live albums DisCover and Deep Purple Tribute, Natur all was the band's first album to feature their own material (although the band had previously published an EP with their own songs, Grad). Besides the band's own songs, Natur all featured a Serbian language cover of U2 song "Hold Me, Thrill Me, Kiss Me, Kill Me", entitled "Model donjeg veša" ("Lingerie Model"), and a cover of Led Zeppelin song "Kashmir". 

Music for the song "Voodoo Magija" ("Voodoo Magic") was written by Petar Zarija, singer of the blues rock band Zona B. The album artwork was designed by Dragoljub "Paja" Bogdanović, who also sang backing vocals on the album; Bogdanović would in 2015 become Cactus Jack frontman.

Track listing

Personnel
Vladimir Jezdimirović – vocals
Stevan Birak – guitar, backing vocals
Miodrag Krudulj – bass guitar
Dušan Gnjidić – drums
Zoran Samuilov – keyboards, Hammond organ

Additional personnel
Dragoljub "Paja" Bogdanović - backing vocals, cover design
Zoran Maletić - producer
Zoran Stefanović - sound engineer
Radovan Maričić - recorded by
Zoran Vukčević - recorded by, mixed by
Zoltan Totka - photography

References 

Natur all at Discogs

External links 
Natur all at Discogs

Cactus Jack (band) albums
2004 debut albums
Serbian-language albums
PGP-RTS albums